Martin Hujsa (born September 9, 1979) is a Slovak professional ice hockey player who currently plays for HK 36 Skalica of the Slovak 1. Liga.

Hujsa previously played in the Slovak Extraliga for HK 36 Skalica, HC Slovan Bratislava and HC Nové Zámky, the Czech Extraliga for HC Litvínov, the Kazakhstan Hockey Championship for Yertis Pavlodar and the Ligue Magnus for Brest Albatros Hockey and Nice hockey Côte d'Azur.

References

External links

1979 births
Living people
Les Aigles de Nice players
Brest Albatros Hockey players
HC Litvínov players
HC Nové Zámky players
Sportspeople from Skalica
HK 36 Skalica players
Slovak ice hockey left wingers
HC Slovan Bratislava players
Yertis Pavlodar players
Slovak expatriate ice hockey players in the Czech Republic
Expatriate ice hockey players in Kazakhstan
Expatriate ice hockey players in France
Slovak expatriate sportspeople in France
Slovak expatriate sportspeople in Kazakhstan